Special Prosecution Book-Poland was the proscription list prepared by the Germans immediately before the onset of war, that identified more than 61,000 members of Polish elites: activists, intelligentsia, scholars, actors, former officers, and prominent others, who were to be interned or shot on the spot upon their identification following the invasion.

History
For nearly two years before the invasion of Poland, between 1937 and 1939, the Sonderfahndungsbuch Polen was being secretly prepared in Germany. It was compiled by the "Zentralstelle IIP Polen" (Central Unit IIP-Poland) unit of the Geheime Staatspolizei or Gestapo ("Secret State Police") from the clandestine human intelligence supplied by members of German minority in Poland involved in the Volksdeutscher Selbstschutz who acted as fifth column.

The Central Unit IIP-Poland was created by Reinhard Heydrich to co-ordinate the ethnic cleansing of all Poles in "Operation Tannenberg" and the Intelligenzaktion, two codenames for the extermination actions directed at the Polish people during the opening stages of World War II.

Formally, the Intelligenzaktion was a second phase of Operation Tannenberg (Unternehmen Tannenberg), conducted by Heydrich's Sonderreferat. It lasted until January 1940 as the first part of the Generalplan Ost. In Pomerania alone, 36,000–42,000 Poles, including children, had been killed by the end of 1939.

The list identified more than 61,000 members of Polish elite: activists, intelligentsia, scholars, actors, former officers, Polish nobility, Catholic priests, university professors, teachers, doctors, lawyers and even a prominent sportsman who had represented Poland in the Berlin Olympics in 1936. People in the Special Prosecution Book were either killed outright by the Einsatzgruppen or the Volksdeutscher Selbstschutz or sent to concentration camps and killed there. The German death squads, including Einsatzkommando 16 and EK-Einmann, fell under direct command of SS-Sturmbannführer Rudolf Tröger, with overall command by Reinhard Heydrich.

The second and last edition of Sonderfahndungsbuch Polen in was published German and Polish in 1940 in occupied Kraków after the end of AB-Aktion (in German Ausserordentliche Befriedungsaktion). Later lists were published under the name of Fahndungsnachweis. Only a small number of people on both lists managed to survive the German occupation.

See also
 Sonderfahndungsliste G.B. ("Special Search List Great Britain"), "The Black Book" of prominent residents of Britain.

References

Bibliography 
Sonderfahndungsbuch Polen. Ergänzungsnachtrag über entwichene oder vorzeitig entlassene Straf... 1. Juni 1940, Krakau,
 Andrzej Leszek Szcześniak, Plan zagłady Słowian. Generalplan Ost, Polskie Wydawnictwo Encyklopedyczne PWE, Radom, 2001
 Fritz Arlt: Polen- Ukrainer-Judenpolitik im Generalgouvernement für die besetzten polnischen Gebiete 1939 bis 1940 in Oberschlesien 1941 bis 1943 und im Freiheitskampf der unterdrückten Ostvölker, Lindhorst, Wissenschaftlicher Buchdienst Taege, 1995
 Wacław Długoborski: Zweiter Weltkrieg und sozialer Wandel, Vandenhoeck & Ruprecht, Göttingen 1981, S. 309

External links 
Digital version of Sonderfahndungsbuch Polen in Śląska Biblioteka Cyfrowa.
Landkreis Rybnik/Sonderfahndungsbuch Polen 1937-1939.

Einsatzgruppen
The Holocaust in Poland
Historiography of World War II
Cultural history of World War II
Holocaust historical documents
Anti-Polish sentiment in Europe
Reinhard Heydrich
Reich Security Main Office
1939 documents
Persecution by Nazi Germany
Persecution of Poles
Persecution of Jews
Persecution of intellectuals